Vivaldi, the Red Priest (Italian: Vivaldi, il prete rosso) is an Italian television film, created and directed by Liana Marabini in 2009, about the life of composer Antonio Vivaldi, who was also a Catholic priest. It shows his relationship with the world, the Church, his spiritual battles and his love for a woman. This co-production between the UK and Italy has two episodes of 90 minutes, and intends to show the spiritual dimension of Vivaldi which is, according to the director, often ignored.

Cast

References

External links
 

Italian biographical films
2009 films
2009 television films
Antonio Vivaldi
Films about classical music and musicians
Films about composers
2000s Italian films